Curt Smith (born 24 June 1961) is a British singer, songwriter, musician, record producer, and co-founding member of the pop rock band Tears for Fears along with childhood friend Roland Orzabal. Smith plays bass guitar, has co-written several of the band's songs, and sings lead vocals on the hits "Mad World", "Pale Shelter", "Change", "The Way You Are", "Everybody Wants to Rule the World", and "Advice for the Young at Heart".

After his departure from Tears for Fears in 1991, Smith pursued a solo career and released his debut studio album, Soul on Board, in 1993. In total, he has released five studio albums and one EP, and has also dabbled in acting. He rejoined Tears for Fears in 2000.

Early life
Smith grew up in Bath, Somerset in England, and lived on the Snow Hill council estate. He attended the Beechen Cliff School.

Musical groups

Graduate
Smith met Roland Orzabal when both were teenagers. They first formed a band in their teens, and Smith taught himself to play bass guitar. They next formed the ska-influenced band Graduate. Graduate released their sole studio album in 1980, achieving minor success in Europe. Around this time, Smith and Orzabal also became session musicians for the band Neon. Fellow band members included Pete Byrne and Rob Fisher, who went on to become the duo Naked Eyes.

Tears for Fears

After Graduate and Neon disbanded, Smith and Orzabal founded Tears for Fears in 1981. Smith is the band's bass player and co-lead vocalist. Their debut studio album, 1983's The Hurting, reached no. 1 in the UK and produced three international hit singles—"Mad World", "Change" and "Pale Shelter"—each with lead vocals performed by Smith.

The duo's second studio album Songs from the Big Chair (1985) hit number one in the United States and went multi-platinum. The album yielded hits including "Everybody Wants to Rule the World" (with Smith again on lead vocals), "Shout," and "Head Over Heels" (which Smith co-wrote).

The next Tears for Fears studio album, The Seeds of Love (1989), proved to be another international success. Smith's only lead vocal track on the album was "Advice for the Young at Heart". Increasing tensions between Smith and Orzabal prompted Smith to leave the band in 1991, and he moved to New York.

In 2000, routine legal paperwork obligations led to Orzabal and Smith's first conversation in nearly a decade. The two patched up their differences and, along with Smith's associate Charlton Pettus, began writing a new studio album—Everybody Loves a Happy Ending—released in 2004.

"Mad World" was re-recorded by Michael Andrews and Gary Jules for the soundtrack of the 2001 film Donnie Darko. A 2003 single release of the song reached number one in the UK for three consecutive weeks and won Orzabal his second Ivor Novello Award. The single re-ignited interest in the group's earlier work. Their 1992 Greatest Hits album was re-released and re-entered the UK Top 10 for several weeks, garnering its second UK platinum disc.

In 2021, Smith and Roland Orzabal were honoured with the Ivor Novello Award for Outstanding Song Collection.

The seventh Tears for Fears studio album, The Tipping Point, was released in February 2022.

Solo albums

Soul on Board

After leaving Tears for Fears, Smith released his debut solo studio album, Soul on Board, in 1993. The album was unsuccessful in the UK, and was not released at all in the United States. Smith later claimed that he made the album purely to fulfill his recording contract with Mercury/Phonogram.

Mayfield and Aeroplane
After moving to New York, Smith formed the band Mayfield with guitarist-producer Charlton Pettus. The band featured Russ Irwin and Doug Petty on keyboards, Smith himself on bass and vocals, and Shawn Pelton on drums. According to Smith, the name of the band was a play on words (Curt is Mayfield) based on the name of the legendary American soul singer Curtis Mayfield. The band was mostly a live act, but did release a self-titled studio album in 1998; it met with little success.

Smith later released the solo studio album Aeroplane under his own name. In the U.S., this was a six-track EP, but in Canada and elsewhere, it was essentially the earlier Mayfield album combined with additional songs from the U.S. EP.

In October 2011, Smith announced on his website that he would re-release the Mayfield album on 15 November 2011. The new release, on his KOOK Media label, would include a bonus version of the song "Trees" featuring Janice Whaley.

Halfway, Pleased

During 2000, Smith began work on what was to become Halfway, Pleased, but the project was put on hold when he began with Roland Orzabal again after almost a decade of silence. In 2006, Smith resumed work on Halfway, Pleased. The semi-autobiographical album explores Smith's relationships with his children, parents and friends. Smith finally released the album in the U.S. and the rest of the world in May 2008 via his own KOOK Media label.

Smith made limited live concert appearances in the Los Angeles area to support Halfway, Pleased. In January 2009, he announced that he would perform a weekly residency at The Standard Hollywood in West Hollywood, CA during the month of February 2009.

Deceptively Heavy
Smith's fourth solo studio album, Deceptively Heavy, was released on 16 July 2013.

"The Social Media Project"
In January 2010, Smith released the standalone single "All Is Love" (featuring Zoë Keating), the first track in what he said would be an album-length project of collaborations with artists he had met via social media. Smith met Keating, a contemporary classical cellist, via Twitter. The second track in the series, "Perfectly...Still (featuring Universal Hall Pass)" was released in August 2010.

Collaborations
Smith occasionally collaborates with other artists. He worked with the French singer So (Sophie Saillet) providing vocals on her track "Les Autres", and the pair worked together again on Smith's track "Seven of Sundays" (Saillet also appeared in both videos for the song). Smith is also featured on the Shadow Bureau's 2011 track "Don't Give Yourself Away" with artist Linda Strawberry, inspired by the 2010 Australian film Griff the Invisible. In May 2011, Smith tweeted that he was working on a track with Junkie XL which features on JXL's studio album Synthesized (2012). He also recorded a vocal track for the American punk band American Eyes on their song entitled "The Day We Died" from the album Never Trust Anything That Bleeds (2005).

Soundtracks
Smith and longtime collaborator Charlton Pettus composed and recorded the score for the 2011 film Meth Head (starring Lukas Haas) and the 2015 film Gravy.

Smith contributed an original song, "This Is Christmas", to an episode of the fifth season of the USA Network series Psych.

"Stripped Down Live with Curt Smith"
In August 2010, Smith debuted a live music web series, "Stripped Down Live with Curt Smith", which he produced along with his manager Arlene Wszalek and Streamin' Garage CEO Mike Rotman. Each episode was devoted to a single featured artist. The band or musician played acoustic versions of their songs (the show was streamed live via Ustream); Smith interviewed them between sets, as well as took viewer questions via Skype and the show's chat room. Smith's guests included Hypnogaja, Carina Round, Chris Pierce, Peter Himmelman, Common Rotation, Gary Jules, All Day Sucker, the Daylights, Matthew Sweet, the Fallen Stars, Nightmare & the Cat, Whiskey Saints, Fitz and the Tantrums and Friendly Indians.

Other activities
In 1988, Smith appeared at the Nelson Mandela 70th Birthday Tribute performing "Everybody Wants to Rule the World", with accompanying musicians Phil Collins, Midge Ure and Mark Brzezicki on stage.

Smith is an avid user and advocate of social media. Since 2008, he has been asked to speak at a variety of social media, technology and creative conferences, including 140TC, the Creative Commons Los Angeles Salon, the 2010 ITV Fest, TEDxHollywood and TEDxSF. He has also guest-lectured at the USC Annenberg School's graduate Online Communities program.

Smith has also tried his hand at acting. He had a minor role as a desk clerk in The Dead Connection (1994), and a more significant role as a professor in 2000's The Private Public. Smith made a surprise appearance to open Psychs 2010 Comic Con panel, where he sang onstage with Psych co-stars James Roday and Dulé Hill. Roday's character Shawn Spencer makes several proclamations throughout the series about his admiration for Tears for Fears, especially Smith. He then appeared, as himself, in the Psych episode "Shawn 2.0", an episode for which he also wrote a variation of the opening theme. His single "This Is Christmas" later appeared in the episode "The Polarizing Express". He again appeared as himself in the show's 100th episode, "100 Clues", in March 2013. He also appeared in the series' penultimate episode "A Nightmare on State Street" as himself. Most recently, he appeared as himself in Psych 3: This Is Gus (2021).

In September 2016, Smith and his drummer Jamie Wollam appeared in the "Orchard" with Ted Yoder to accompany him on a re-recording of his popular rendition of "Everybody Wants to Rule the World" played on the hammered dulcimer.

Personal life
Smith has been married twice. His first wife was Lynda "Lynne" Altman, whom he married in 1982. They divorced in 1988, and he then began a relationship with marketing executive Frances Pennington. They married in 1996 and now live in Los Angeles with their two daughters, Diva and Wilder, born in 1999 and 2001. Diva is also a musician, and released a song titled "Bet" in 2021. Smith became a naturalised U.S. citizen in 2007. He is a supporter of Manchester United and Los Angeles FC.

In April 2020, while staying home under general quarantine orders due to the COVID-19 pandemic, Smith and his daughter Diva performed an acoustic guitar rendition of "Mad World" in the style of the 2001 Donnie Darko soundtrack.

Discography

Solo
 Soul on Board (1993)
 Aeroplane (1999)
 Halfway, Pleased (2008)
 Deceptively Heavy (2013)

EP
 Aeroplane (2000)

Mayfield
 Mayfield (1998)

See also
Ian Stanley
Manny Elias
Will Gregory

References

External links 

 Curt Smith Official Website
 
 
 
 

1961 births
Living people
20th-century English singers
21st-century English singers
21st-century American singers
APRA Award winners
Musicians from Bath, Somerset
English male singers
English rock bass guitarists
English new wave musicians
English songwriters
English record producers
English emigrants to the United States
Tears for Fears members
Musicians from Los Angeles
People educated at Beechen Cliff School
Songwriters from California
Male new wave singers
Creative Commons-licensed authors
20th-century British male singers
21st-century British male singers
British tenors
English tenors
British male songwriters
Neon (British band) members
Graduate (band) members